Jiří Hauschka (born 24 August 1965) is a Czech painter and member of the Stuckists, an international art movement. Born in Šumperk, he now lives in Prague. He received classical arts education. His work is borderline between abstraction and figuration. His works are represented in the National Gallery in Prague and in many private collections.

Work 
Although Jiří Hauschka has painted since childhood, he has never been fully devoted to painting. During art history lessons he listened to teachers with great interest and when the Surrealists were discussed as subject matter, he started to love them. However, painting was still losing ground to his numerous interests. Only at the age of 38 he decided to turn all the attention to art work.

At the beginning, his work was distinguished by abstract style. His artistic development was significantly influenced by his stay in the UK in 2005 when he met Charles Thomson, the founder of the Stuckism. At that time Hauschka leaves a strictly abstract style and focuses on detail and distinctive black line drawing, resembling pen drawing. After returning from the UK, he approached realistic conception; his work balances between abstraction and magic realism. The themes are inspired by the author's experience and perceptions (two worlds: deep inner and specific outer), which freely wind through the author's work.

He has a characteristic sense of the surface composition, a distinctive contour line, symbolic colourfulness and, in particular, characteristic fluidity of forms, adding organic dynamics to the depicted objects. His landscape paintings often reflect fascination by the magic and mystique of the forest, with an almost gloomy atmosphere of forest mists. Hauschka is fascinated by spaces of a modern city which speak through their history. He is also attracted by the places where a man has left his footprint, and thus he often places a human figure into his compositions. Edward Lucie-Smith wrote about him: "Jiri Hauschka is one of the most interesting artists who have appeared on the Czech scene during a quarter century after the fall of communism."

Solo exhibition 
2015 Black Swan Gallery, Vernisage, Prague (CZ)

2015 House od Art Gallery, In the Middle of Somewhere, Prague (CZ)

2014 Era Gallery, Prague (CZ)

2014 Oko Gallery (Town Hall Gallery), Opava (CZ)

2013 Michal‘s Collection Gallery (with Albert Ruiz Villar), Prague (CZ)

2013 Magna Gallery, Ostrava (CZ)

2012 21st Century Gallery, Prague (CZ)

2011 Vltavín Gallery, Prague (CZ)

2011 Red Gate Gallery, London (with J. Valecka) (UK)

2011 Rabas Gallery, Rakovník  (CZ)

2010 Stuckists and guests, 21st Century Gallery, Prague (CZ)

2010 Kotelna Gallery, Říčany (CZ)

2008 Dolmen Gallery, Prague (CZ)

2010 XXL Gallery, Louny (CZ)

2006 The Residence Gallery, London (UK)

2005 Hellge Gallery, Passau (D)

2005 Town Hall Gallery Prachatice (CZ)

2004 Library Gallery Liberec (CZ)

Group exhibitions
2016 Art Prague, Prague (CZ)

2015 Stuckism: Remodernising the Mainstream, Studio 3 Gallery, Canterbury (UK)

2015 Art Prague, Prague (CZ)

2014 Art and time, Black Swan Gallery, Prague (CZ)

2014 Gallery Goltozova tvrz, Golčův Jeníkov (CZ)

2014 The Stuckists, Explorers and Inventors, Phoenix (USA)

2014 STUCK!!, Vltavín Gallery, Prague (CZ)

2014 Group M, Gallery Rabas Rakovník (CZ)

2013 Stuck between Prague and London, Nolias Gallery, London (UK)

2013 Group M, Castle Kvasiny (CZ)

2013 Group M Gallery Mánes, Prague (CZ)

2013 STUCK in Pardubice, Town Hall Gallery Pardubice (CZ)

2012 Stuckists: Elizabethian Avant-Garde, Bermondsey Gallery, London (UK)

2012 Original and perspective, Klatovy – Klenová Gallery  (CZ)

2012 Endangered species, ArtPro Gallery, Prague  (CZ)

2011 Enemies of Art, Lauderdale House Gallery, London (UK)

2011 Prague stuckists, Town Hall Gallery Chrudim (CZ)

2010 Stuckists and guests, 21st Century Gallery, Prague

2010 „Summer choice“ Gallery Vltavín, Prague (CZ)

2010 „Private landscape“ Gallery S.U.V. Mánes Diamant, Prague (CZ)

2009 „Art at the castle“, Ostrava castle, Ostrava (CZ)

2009 „Prague stuckists“, Gallery Dolmen, Prague (CZ)

2008 „Stuck in the middle od November II”,Gallery Dolmen (CZ)

2008  Art Prague, Mánes, Prague (CZ)

2007 „Stuck in the middle od November”, Topičův salon Gallery, Prague (CZ)

2006  „The Brighton Stuckists” Art House Gallery, Brighton (UK)

References

External links 
 official homepage
 Braunovny - BBraun
 Artmagazin.eu

Living people
Czech painters
1965 births